Shepherdswell railway station is a station on the East Kent Railway. The southern terminus of the East Kent Light Railway, It opened on 16 October 1916 and closed to passenger traffic after the last train on 30 October 1948.  Shepherdswell was the location of the engine shed and works, and many sidings. It served the village of Shepherdswell or Sibertswold.

The station reopened as part of the East Kent Railway in 1993.

References 

 

Heritage railway stations in Kent
Former East Kent Light Railway stations
Railway stations in Great Britain opened in 1916
Railway stations in Great Britain closed in 1948
Railway stations in Great Britain opened in 1993